Jessica Regina Korda (born February 27, 1993) is a Czech-American professional golfer who plays on the LPGA Tour.

Amateur career
Korda was a member of the 2009 U.S. Junior Solheim Cup and the 2010 U.S. Curtis Cup teams. As an amateur, she won the 2010 South Atlantic Amateur and made the cut at the 2008 and 2009 U.S. Women's Opens.  Korda finished T19 in her U.S. Open debut in 2008 where she shot the only round in the 60s on Sunday, shooting a 69. She finished runner-up at the 2010 U.S. Women's Amateur.

She represented the Czech Republic in the World Amateur Team Championship Espirito Santo Trophy in 2006, and represented the United States in 2010, finishing tied for 4th individually and silver medalist with her team.

Korda entered LPGA Tour Qualifying School in the fall of 2010 as a 17-year-old. She finished runner-up in the final Qualifying Tournament, making her eligible for full membership on the Tour in 2011.

Professional career
Korda turned 18 during the second event of the 2011 season. She played in 15 events in her rookie year; her best finish was a tie for 19th at the Avnet LPGA Classic. Her first professional win was in the first event of the 2012 season, the Women's Australian Open at Royal Melbourne. After rounds of 72-70-73-74, her victory came on the second hole of a six-person playoff.

Korda won her second LPGA Tour title at the season opening Pure Silk-Bahamas LPGA Classic in January 2014, finishing one shot ahead of Stacy Lewis.

Korda represented United States at the Solheim Cup in 2013, 2019 and  2021. She also qualified for the U.S. team in 2017, after finishing fifth in points, but did not play after withdrawing with a forearm injury and was replaced by Paula Creamer.

Personal life
Korda is the daughter of retired professional tennis players Petr Korda and Regina Rajchrtová.  Her father is a grand slam champion, winning the 1998 Australian Open crown.  Her younger brother, Sebastian, won the 2018 Australian Open title in the boys' division.

Her personal and professional lives intersected at the 2013 U.S. Women's Open. During the third round of that event, she and caddy Jason Gilroyed had several disagreements, and she fired him after shooting 5-over-par for the first nine holes. She then called for her boyfriend, professional golfer Johnny DelPrete, to come in from the gallery and serve as her caddy for the rest of the round. Korda shot 1-under for the second nine, and she kept DelPrete on her bag for the final round.

Her younger sister Nelly Korda joined her on the 2017 LPGA Tour after earning her card via the Symetra Tour and advanced to world number one on the Women's World Golf Rankings in 2021.

She married her longtime boyfriend Johnny DelPrete on December 11, 2021.

Professional wins (6)

LPGA Tour wins (6)

LPGA Tour playoff record (2–0)

Results in LPGA majors
Results not in chronological order before 2019.

^ The Evian Championship was added as a major in 2013.

CUT = missed the half-way cut
WD = withdrew
NT = no tournament
T = tied

Summary

Most consecutive cuts made – 10 (2020 U.S. Open – 2022 WPGA)
Longest streak of top-10s – 3 (2018 Evian – 2019 U.S. Open)

LPGA Tour career summary

^ official as of 2022 season
* Includes matchplay and other tournaments without a cut.

World ranking
Position in Women's World Golf Rankings at the end of each calendar year.

^ as of March 6, 2023

Team appearances
Amateur
Espirito Santo Trophy (representing the Czech Republic): 2006
European Girls' Team Championship (representing the Czech Republic): 2007
Espirito Santo Trophy (representing the United States): 2010
Junior Solheim Cup (representing the United States): 2009 (winners)
Curtis Cup (representing the United States): 2010 (winners)

Professional
Solheim Cup (representing the United States): 2013, 2019, 2021
International Crown (representing the United States): 2018

Solheim Cup record

References

External links

American female golfers
Czech female golfers
LPGA Tour golfers
Solheim Cup competitors for the United States
Olympic golfers of the United States
Golfers at the 2020 Summer Olympics
Golfers from Florida
Sportspeople from Bradenton, Florida
American people of Czech descent
1993 births
Living people
21st-century American women